Career Opportunities is a 1991 American romantic comedy film starring Frank Whaley in his first lead role and co-starring Jennifer Connelly. It was written and co-produced by John Hughes and directed by Bryan Gordon. In the film, Whaley plays Jim Dodge, a persuasive but irresponsible young man who lands a job as an overnight janitor at a local Target store. One evening after hours, he finds himself alone with the affluent but mistreated Josie McClellan (Connelly).

Hughes chose Gordon to direct his screenplay after he was impressed with one of Gordon's short films. The film was shot at a Target store located outside Atlanta. The film grossed $11 million at the box office, and received mostly negative reviews from critics. Hughes distanced himself from the film.

Plot
Twenty-one-year-old Jim Dodge is a self-proclaimed "people person" and dreamer, perceived as lazy and good-for-nothing. After being fired from numerous low-paying jobs, Jim is given the choice by his father, Bud Dodge, to either land a job at the local Target or be sent to St. Louis to work for his uncle.

Jim is hired as a night cleanup boy at Target. On his first shift at his new job, Jim is locked alone in the store by his boss, the head custodian, who leaves him there until his shift ends at 7 am. He encounters beautiful Josie McClellan, a stereotypical "spoiled rich girl" whom he has known all his life. Josie had spent the past several hours asleep in a dressing room after backing out of shoplifting some merchandise in a half-hearted attempt to run away from her abusive father, Roger Roy McClellan.

Josie and Jim begin to connect with each other, realizing they are not so different. They begin to form a romantic relationship, and proceed to enjoy the freedom of having such a large store to themselves. Josie, having $52,000 in her purse, convinces Jim to run away with her to Los Angeles as soon as they leave the store in the morning. Meanwhile, Roger teams up with the town sheriff to search for his runaway daughter all night.

Two incompetent crooks, Nestor Pyle and Gil Kinney, break in and hold the two hostage. Eventually, Josie seduces one of the crooks and convinces him to take her with them after robbing the store. While the criminals are loading stolen merchandise into their car, Josie jumps into the front seat and drives away, leaving the two men stranded in the parking lot. Meanwhile, in the building, Jim loads up a shotgun found in the head custodian's locker and tricks Nestor and Gil by luring them to the back of the store and holding them at gunpoint.

In the morning, the sheriff arrives and stumbles upon the two crooks, having been tied up by Jim. Jim and Josie run away and are then seen lounging next to a pool in Hollywood.

Cast

Production
It was the first film directed by Bryan Gordon. John Hughes approached him to direct after having been impressed by Gordon's short film, Ray's Male Heterosexual Dance Hall, which won the Academy Award for Best Live Short in 1987. Gordon said he took the job of Career Opportunities to "learn about myself and how to make a movie."

Frank Whaley, cast in the lead, said his character was "a little akin to Ferris Bueller."

After a nationwide search, the filmmakers chose the rural area of Monroe, Georgia, for the film's locale. The Target store was number T-378, and was located at 4000 Covington Highway in Decatur, just outside of Atlanta. The store had formerly been a Richway location, which was renovated after Target's Southeast expansion in the late 1980s. Whaley went to the location with the director before shooting and "looked for bits. So all those little montages, that was stuff that we came up with." He says he and Connelly "got along really well and, people remember certain shots from that movie." The store has since closed.

Principal photography began on November 13, 1989, with an estimated seven-week filming schedule. It was shot over the Christmas holiday shopping season; a writer at the American Film Institute noted that "Some store employees remained after hours, and several were chosen to be background actors, while others restocked departments utilized by the production crew." Shooting at night "does something to your psyche", said Whaley. The filmmakers created an additional "Garden of Eden" set within the store, designed for an emotional scene between the film's leads.

The film was released in the United Kingdom as One Wild Night.

Reception

Box office
Career Opportunities was a box office disappointment at the time of its release. It reached number four in its first week, earning $4,024,800, and made $11,336,986 in the North American market.

Critical response
A trailer used to advertise the film featured Connelly on a riding horse. Rolling Stone later wondered if the filmmakers "perhaps realizing they had a complete dog of a movie on their hands, attempted to hard-sell the dubious teen flick as some sort of cleavage fanatic's wet dream."

Hughes said the film was "a disappointment" because "I didn't have my usual creative controls." Hughes later stated the film was "cheap and vulgar" and that his suggestions were ignored. He says he tried to take his name off the film but Universal refused in the wake of the success of Home Alone. He added: "Suddenly I'm a commodity. If Home Alone hadn't come out my name wouldn't be on Career Opportunities four times."

Whaley said: "The movie kind of tanked." He added:

I think if they made that movie today it would be kind of cool, but it just lacked a little bit of the reverence of other movies written by John Hughes. The soundtrack was certainly classic John Hughes fare. I mean, I happen to think it's kind of a cool movie. I think it's different than his other movies, and I think that casting me was a daring move. [Laughs.] Because I didn't sort of fit into that mold. I played it a little bit different. I was just… slightly off. And I think that might've been part of the demise of the whole thing.

Rotten Tomatoes retrospectively gives the film a score of 39% based on reviews from 18 critics, with an average rating of 4.9 out of 10. On Metacritic, the film has a score of 41 out of 100 based on 14 reviews, indicating "mixed or average reviews". Audiences surveyed by CinemaScore gave the film a grade of "C+" on scale of A+ to F.

References

External links

 
 
 
 
 

1991 films
1991 directorial debut films
1991 romantic comedy films
American romantic comedy films
Films directed by Bryan Gordon
Films produced by John Hughes (filmmaker)
Films scored by Thomas Newman
Films set in department stores
Films set in shopping malls
Films set in Illinois
Films shot in Georgia (U.S. state)
Films with screenplays by John Hughes (filmmaker)
Target Corporation
Universal Pictures films
1990s English-language films
1990s American films